Bill Hayward is a former rugby union international who represented United States of America in 1991.

Early life
Bill Hayward studied at Loughborough University and was a member of the Loughborough Students RUFC.

Rugby union career
Hayward made his international debut on May 4, 1991  at Rockne Stadium, Chicago in the United States vs Japan match. Of the  matches he played for his national side he was on the winning side on one occasion. He played his final match for United States of America on June 8, 1991 at Kingsland, Calgary in a Canada vs USA match.

References

American rugby union players
Loughborough Students RUFC players
Alumni of Loughborough University
United States international rugby union players
Living people
American expatriate rugby union players
Expatriate rugby union players in England
American expatriate sportspeople in England
Year of birth missing (living people)
Rugby union fullbacks